Revaa is an Indian composer working predominantly in Tamil cinema. Her Tamil film debut was Mughizh. Revaa gained popularity with her noticeable work in Ayali, a streaming web series released in 2023. Her upcoming feature film to release is Aasai, directed by Shiv Mohaa.

Career 
Revaa started her music career in Advertising and media in 2014. She has composed music for commercials, pilot movies, documentaries, video songs, TV series and penned lyrics for a few commercials and video songs. Revaa made her Malayalam and Marathi debut in 2019. Tamil debut in Mughizh released in 2021.

Discography

References 

Tamil musicians
Tamil